This is a list of Holocaust memorials and museums situated in the United States, organized by state.

Online only
 The Cybrary of the Holocaust
 The Nizkor Project

Arizona
 The Center for Hope, Humanity, and Holocaust Education (Phoenix)
 Jewish Museum and Holocaust Center (Tucson)

California
 The Desert Holocaust Memorial (Palm Desert)
 Holocaust Center of Northern California (San Francisco)
 The Holocaust Memorial at California Palace of the Legion of Honor, Lincoln Park (San Francisco)
 Los Angeles Museum of the Holocaust
 The Museum of Tolerance (Los Angeles)
 The Pink Triangle Park (San Francisco)
 The Simon Wiesenthal Center (Los Angeles)
 The Survivors of the Shoah Visual History Foundation at University of Southern California (Los Angeles)

Colorado 
 The Babi Yar Park (Denver)
 Holocaust Memorial Social Action Site (University of Denver campus)

Florida
 The Florida Holocaust Museum (St. Petersburg)
The Frisch Family Holocaust Memorial Gallery (Jacksonville)
 The Holocaust Memorial of the Greater Miami Jewish Federation (Miami Beach)
 The Holocaust Documentation & Education Center (Dania Beach)
The Holocaust Museum & Education Center of SWFL (Naples)
The Holocaust Memorial Resource and Education Center (Maitland)

Georgia
 The Kennesaw State University Museum of History and Holocaust Education (Kennesaw)
 The William Breman Jewish Heritage Museum (Atlanta)

Idaho
 Anne Frank Human Rights Memorial (Boise)

Illinois
 Illinois Holocaust Museum and Education Center (Skokie)
 Peoria Holocaust Memorial (Peoria)

Indiana
 CANDLES Holocaust Museum and Education Center (Terre Haute)

Louisiana
 New Orleans Holocaust Memorial at Woldenberg Park, 
sculpture by Yaacov Agam.

 Alexandria Holocaust Memorial, Holocaust Memorial Park

Maine
 The Holocaust and Human Rights Center of Maine (Augusta)

Maryland
 The Baltimore Holocaust Memorial

Massachusetts
 The New England Holocaust Memorial (Boston)

 A Reason to Remember: Roth, Germany, 1933-1942 housed at Institute for Holocaust, Genocide, and Memory Studies at University of Massachusetts Amherst

Michigan
 The Holocaust Memorial Center (Farmington Hills)
 University of Michigan Holocaust Memorial, Raoul Wallenberg Plaza (Ann Arbor)
sculpture by Leonard Baskin
 Holocaust Memorial, Oakview Cemetery (Royal Oak)

Mississippi
 Holocaust Memorial (Clarksdale)
 Unknown Child Foundation (Hernando)

Missouri
 Kaplan Feldman Holocaust Museum, St. Louis

Nebraska
 The Nebraska Holocaust Memorial (Lincoln)

New Hampshire
New Hampshire Holocaust Memorial (Nashua)

New Jersey

Museums and institutions
 Esther Raab Holocaust Museum & Goodwin Education Center, Cherry Hill
 The Jewish Foundation for the Righteous (Manhattan)
 Sara & Sam Schoffer Holocaust Resource Center, Galloway

Monuments
 The "South Jersey Holocaust memorial", Alliance cemetery (Norma)
 Camden County Holocaust Memorial (Cherry Hill) dedicated June 7, 1981
 Liberation, Liberty State Park (Jersey City)
 Holocaust memorial at "Congregation Sons of Israel" synagogue, 590 Madison Ave (Lakewood)
 (Proposed) The "Northern New Jersey Holocaust Memorial", Teaneck Municipal Green (Teaneck)
 The "Hunterdon County Holocaust Memorial" at The Flemington Jewish Community Center Cemetery on Capner St. (Flemington)

Markers
 Holocaust marker at the Bergen County Court House (Hackensack)
 Holocaust marker at the Fair Lawn Municipal Building (Fair Lawn)

New Mexico
 The New Mexico Holocaust & Intolerance Museum, Albuquerque

New York

Museums and institutions
 Amud Aish Memorial Museum (Brooklyn)
 Museum of Jewish Heritage (Manhattan)
 Holocaust Memorial and Tolerance Center of Nassau County, Welwyn Preserve (Glen Cove, Long Island)
 Stuart Elenko Holocaust Museum at the Bronx High School of Science (Bronx)
Safe Haven Holocaust Refugee Shelter Museum (Oswego)

Monuments
 The Holocaust Memorial Park (Brooklyn)
 Holocaust Memorial, City Hall Plaza (Long Beach)
 Memorial to Victims of the Injustice of the Holocaust: 1938–1945, Appellate Division of the New York State Supreme Court (Manhattan)
 (Proposed) The "Capital District Jewish Holocaust Memorial", 2501 Troy Schenectady Road (Niskayuna)
Warsaw Ghetto Memorial Plaza in Riverside Park (Manhattan)

Ohio
 Ohio Holocaust and Liberators Memorial at the Ohio Statehouse (Columbus)
 “Promise For Life” sculpture on the Trinity Lutheran Seminary campus.(Columbus)
 Nancy & David Wolf Holocaust & Humanity Center, Cincinnati Union Terminal (Cincinnati)
 Holocaust Memorial (Cleveland)
 Maltz Museum of Jewish Heritage (Beachwood)

Oregon
 Oregon Holocaust Memorial (Portland)

Pennsylvania
 The Holocaust Awareness Museum and Education Center (Philadelphia)
 Holocaust Memorial (Harrisburg)
 Holocaust Center of Pittsburgh (Pittsburgh)
 The Horwitz-Wasserman Holocaust Memorial Plaza (Philadelphia)
 Memorial to the Six Million Jewish Martyrs

Rhode Island 
 Sandra Bornstein Holocaust Education Center (Providence)
 Rhode Island Holocaust Memorial Park (Providence)

South Carolina
 Charleston Holocaust Memorial (Charleston)

Tennessee
 Nashville Holocaust Memorial (Nashville) 
 The Children's Holocaust Memorial and Paper Clip Project at Whitwell Middle School (Whitwell)

Texas
 The Dallas Holocaust and Human Rights Museum
 The El Paso Holocaust Museum and Study Center
 The Holocaust History Project (San Antonio)
 Holocaust Museum Houston
 The Holocaust Memorial Museum of San Antonio

Washington
 Holocaust Center for Humanity (Seattle)

Washington, D.C.
 The United States Holocaust Memorial Museum

Wisconsin
 Holocaust Memorial (Milwaukee)

Virginia
 Emek Sholom Holocaust Memorial Cemetery (Henrico)
 The Virginia Holocaust Museum (Richmond)

See also

 List of Holocaust memorials and museums — worldwide

References

External links

US
01
Holocaust
Holocaust
Holocaust
Holocaust
Memorials and museums